Wadi Mujib (Wadi el-Mujib), also known as Arnon Stream (Hebrew: נַחַל ארנון), is a river in Jordan. Today, Wadi Mujib is fed by seven tributaries. The western part of the river is the site of the Mujib Biosphere Reserve, popular for hikes & canyoning amid dramatic rock formations.

Geography

It flooded the lower areas of the canyons along its banks, which became bays and begun to accumulate sediments. As the climatic conditions changed, about 20,000 years ago, the water level of the lake dropped, leaving the re-emergent canyons blocked with lake marl.
Most canyons managed to cut through their plugged outlets and to resume their lower courses. However, Wadi Mujib, abandoned its former outlet by breaking through a cleft in the sandstone. During the years the cleft was scoured deeper and the gorge of Wadi Mujib was formed.

A  reserve was created in 1987 by the Royal Society for the Conservation of Nature and is regionally and internationally important, particularly for the bird life that the reserve supports. In 2011, UNESCO declared Mujib biosphere reserve. This  variation in elevation of its drainage basin, combined with the valley's year round water flow from seven tributaries, means that Wadi Mujib enjoys a magnificent biodiversity that is still being explored and documented today. The reserve consists of mountainous, rocky, and sparsely vegetated desert (up to ), with cliffs and gorges cutting through plateaus. Perennial, spring-fed streams flow to the shores of the Dead Sea.

Over 300 species of plants, 10 species of carnivores and numerous species of permanent and migratory birds have been recorded until this date. Some of the remote mountain and valley areas are difficult to reach, and thus offer safe havens for rare species of cats, goats and other mountain animals.

The slopes of the mountainous land are very sparsely vegetated, with a steppe-type vegetation on plateaus. Groundwater seepage does occur in places along the Dead Sea shore, for example at the hot springs of Zara, which support a luxuriant thicket of Acacia, Tamarix, Phoenix and Nerium, and a small marsh. The less severe slopes of the reserve are used by pastoralists for the grazing of sheep and goats.

The hot springs of Hammamat Ma'in lie close to the borders of the reserve are heavily used for tourism and recreation.

The Jordanian military have a temporary camp in the south of the reserve.

The Mujib Dam was completed in 2004 at the bottom of the wadi, where the modern road crosses the river. As a result, a large lake has formed.

Biology and ecology

Fauna 
The reserve is strategically important as a safe stop-over for the huge number of migratory birds which fly annually along the Great Rift Valley between Africa and northeast Europe.

It is possible to see the following birds in Wadi Mujib:

Lammergeier (Gypaetus barbatus)
Egyptian vulture (Neophron percnopterus)
Eurasian griffon (Gyps fulvus)
Levant sparrowhawk (Accipiter brevipes)
Lesser kestrel (Falco naumanni)
Sooty falcon (Falco concolor)
Sand partridge (Ammoperdix heyi)
Hume's owl (Strix butleri)
Hooded wheatear (Oenanthe monacha)
Blackstart (Cercomela melanura)
Arabian babbler (Turdoides squamiceps)
Striolated bunting (Emberiza striolata)
Trumpeter finch (Bucanetes githagineus)
Dead Sea sparrow (Passer moabiticus)
Tristram's starling (Onychognathus tristramii)

Many carnivores also inhabit the various vegetation zones in Mujib, such as the striped hyena and the Syrian wolf.

Another common animal in Mujib is the Nubian ibex, a large mountain goat which became threatened as a result of over-hunting.

Biblical history

Wadi Mujib, or the Arnon Stream as it was known in biblical times, has always been an important boundary-line. According to the Hebrew Bible, it once separated the Moabites from the Amorites.

Following the Israelite settlement the stream divided, theoretically at least, Moab from the tribes of Reuben and Gad. But Moab, in fact, lay as much to the north as it did to the south of the Arnon. To the north, for example, were Aroer, Dibon, Medeba, and other Moabite towns. Even under Omri and Ahab, who held part of the Moabite territory, Israel did not hold sway farther south than Ataroth, about ten miles north of the Arnon.

Mesha, King of Moab, in his inscription (Mesha Stele, line 10) says that the Gadites (not the Reubenites) formerly occupied Ataroth, whence he in turn expelled the people of Israel. He mentions (line 26) his having constructed a road along the Arnon. The ancient importance of the river and of the towns in its vicinity is attested by the numerous ruins of bridges, forts, and buildings found upon or near it. Its fords are alluded to by the Book of Isaiah. Its "heights," crowned with the castles of chiefs, were also celebrated in verse.

Panorama

See also
Dana Biosphere Reserve
Azraq Wetland Reserve
Nature Reserves in Jordan
Wadi Zarqa

References

External links

The Royal Society for the Conservation of Nature, Jordan
Flora and Fauna of Wadi Mujib
Constraints for Sustainable Eco Tourism in Mujib
Photos of Wadi Mujib at the American Center of Research

Rivers of Jordan
Nature reserves in Jordan
Dead Sea basin
Protected areas established in 1987
1987 establishments in Jordan
Torah places
Hebrew Bible valleys